Suyruqucha (Quechua suyru a very long dress tracked after when worn, qucha lake, also spelled Suiricocha) is a mountain in the Paryaqaqa or Waruchiri mountain range in the Andes of Peru, about  high. It is located in the Junín Region, Jauja Province, Canchayllo District, in the Yauli Province, Suitucancha District, and in the Lima Region, Huarochiri Province, Quinti District. It lies on the western border of the Nor Yauyos-Cochas Landscape Reserve. It is situated northwest of Qullqip'ukru. Wararayuq lies west of it.

References

Mountains of Peru
Mountains of Junín Region
Mountains of Lima Region
Landforms of Lima Region